The men's 500 metres sprint event at the 2010 Asian Games was held in Guangzhou Velodrome, Guangzhou on 23 November.

Schedule
All times are China Standard Time (UTC+08:00)

Results

Heats

Heat 1

Heat 2

Final

References

Roller Sports Results Book Page 5–7

External links
Results

Roller sports at the 2010 Asian Games